Haritalodes amboinensis is a moth in the family Crambidae. It was described by Patrice J.A. Leraut in 2005. It is found on Ambon Island in Indonesia.

References

Moths described in 2005
Spilomelinae